Coloconger eximia is an eel in the family Colocongridae (worm eels/short-tail eels). It was described by Peter Henry John Castle in 1967, originally under the genus Ascomana. It is a marine, deep-water dwelling eel which is known from Cape Peninsula, South Africa, in the southeastern Atlantic Ocean.

C. eximia has one of the largest known fish larvae, growing to at least 70 cm (27.5 in).  Their leptocephalus larvae are elongate, with a long, straight gut, a dorsal fin that originates in the latter half of the body, well-developed pectoral fins, and a long head.

References

Eels
Taxa named by Peter Henry John Castle
Fish described in 1967